The Butterley Gangroad was an early tramway in Derbyshire of approximately  gauge, which linked Hilt's Quarry and other limestone quarries at Crich with the Cromford Canal at Bullbridge. The first railway project of Derbyshire civil engineer Benjamin Outram (1764–1805), the line was originally a horse-drawn and gravity-driven plateway, a form of tramway that Outram popularised. Unlike modern edgeways, where flanges on the wheel guide it along the track, plateways used "L" shaped rails where a flange on the rail guided the wheels. 

The line was constructed in 1793, with the construction of Fritchley Tunnel, now believed to be the world's oldest railway tunnel, being required to go under a road junction at Fritchley. 

A steam locomotive using a walking mechanism, known as the Steam Horse locomotive, was trialled on the line in 1813. In the 1840s, upgrading took place to accommodate steam locomotives, and part of the original line was moved. 

The railway remained in use until 1933.

See also 
 Butterley Company
 Peak Forest Tramway
 Steam Horse locomotive

References

External links 
 http://www.butterleygangroad.co.uk/

3 ft 6 in gauge railways in England
Closed railway lines in the East Midlands
Railway lines opened in 1793
Horse-drawn railways
1793 establishments in England
1933 disestablishments in England